Fellipe Bertoldo dos Santos (born 5 January 1991) is a Brazilian football player who plays as a midfielder.

He formerly played for Mitra Kukar in the Indonesia Soccer Championship. In January 2016 he signed a one-year contract with the Iranian team Esteghlal Khuzestan F.C.

Despite having no links with East Timor, he had been naturalised and played for the country's national team between 2014 and 2015. On 19 January 2017, the Asian Football Confederation declared Bertoldo and eleven other Brazilian footballers ineligible to represent East Timor. Two months later, the East Timorese passport he had received has been declared ‘null and void’ by the Ministry of Justice of East Timor.

Club statistics

Honours 
Esteghlal Khuzestan
Iran Pro League (1): 2015–16

Arema
Indonesia President's Cup (1): 2017

References

External links 
 
 

 Fellipe Bertoldo at playmakerstats.com (English version of leballonrond.fr)

1991 births
Living people
Footballers from São Paulo
Brazilian footballers
Association football midfielders

Botafogo Futebol Clube (SP) players
J2 League players
Japan Football League players
Verspah Oita players
Oita Trinita players
Esteghlal Khuzestan players
Brazilian expatriate footballers
Brazilian expatriate sportspeople in Japan
Expatriate footballers in Japan
Brazilian expatriate sportspeople in Iran
Expatriate footballers in Iran

Timor-Leste international footballers
East Timorese footballers
Asian Games competitors for East Timor
Footballers at the 2014 Asian Games